The United States Air Force's Global Strike Challenge is an annual competition where different sections of the Air Force compete in a series of challenges to prove their speed and readiness. Until 201 it was known as the  Guardian Challenge.

See also
United States Air Force Missile Combat Competition
LGM-30 Minuteman
LGM-25C Titan II

References

External links
Official site

United States Air Force
United States nuclear command and control